The 1st European Athletics U23 Cup was held on 18–19 July 1992. The participating teams were classified in two divisions, A and B.

The competition was restricted to athletes that did not complete their 23rd birthday in 1992, i.e. born in 1970 or later (including junior athletes).  This rule was interpreted differently by Bulgaria and Greece, sending also athletes born in 1969.

Division A
The contest for division A took place in Gateshead, United Kingdom.  The teams from the Commonwealth of Independent States and Poland were withdrawn.

Team trophies

Men

Women

Results
Winners and results were published.

Men

: The 100 m event was initially won by Jason Livingston from the United Kingdom (10.72s), but he was disqualified for infringement of IAAF doping rules.
: The 4 × 100 m relay event was initially won by the United Kingdom (39.11s), but the team was disqualified for infringement of IAAF doping rules by team member Jason Livingston.

Women

 The 400 m event was initially won by Manuela Derr from Germany (52.86s), but she was disqualified for infringement of IAAF doping rules.
 The 4 × 400 m relay event was initially won by Germany (3:32.69), but the team was disqualified for infringement of IAAF doping rules by team member Manuela Derr.

Division B
The competition for division B took place in Villeneuve-d'Ascq, France.

Team scores

Men

Women

Results
Winners and results were published.

Men

Women

References

European Athletics U23 Cup
European Athletics U23 Cup
European Athletics U23 Cup
European Athletics U23 Cup
European Athletics U23 Championships
Villeneuve-d'Ascq
20th century in Tyne and Wear
Sport in Gateshead
International athletics competitions hosted by France
European Athletics U23 Cup
International athletics competitions hosted by England
European Athletics U23 Cup